Kacper Trelowski (born 19 August 2003) is a Polish professional footballer who plays as a goalkeeper for Raków Częstochowa.

Career statistics

Club

Honours
Raków Częstochowa
 Polish Cup: 2021–22

References

2003 births
Living people
Sportspeople from Częstochowa
Polish footballers
Poland under-21 international footballers
Association football goalkeepers
Ekstraklasa players
II liga players
III liga players
Raków Częstochowa players
Sokół Ostróda players